The 1983 All Japan Endurance Championship was the inaugural season of the All Japan Sports Prototype Championship. The series champion was the #1 Trust Racing Team Porsche 956 driven by Australian Vern Schuppan, who earlier in the year had won the 1983 24 Hours of Le Mans.

Schedule
All races were held in Japan.

Season results
Season results are as follows:

Point Ranking

Drivers

References

External links
1983 全日本耐久レース選手権 

JSPC seasons
All Japan Endurance Championship
All Japan Endurance Championship